This is a list of vehicles sold under the Isuzu brand name.

Current production vehicles

Former production vehicles
1961-1967 Isuzu Bellel
1962-1980 Isuzu BU
1963-1973 Isuzu Bellett
1997-1999 Isuzu Fargo Filly
1999-2002 Isuzu Filly
1967-1983 Isuzu Florian
1968-1981 Isuzu 117 Coupé
1980-2001 Isuzu Fargo
1972-2002 Isuzu Faster
1974-2000 Isuzu Gemini
1976-2001 Isuzu Journey-Q
1980-1984 Isuzu C
1981-1993 Isuzu Piazza
1981-2002 Isuzu Trooper
1983-2002 Isuzu Aska
1984-2000 Isuzu Cubic
1984-1999 Isuzu Journey-K
1986-1996 Isuzu Super Cruiser
1988-2004 Isuzu Rodeo
1989-2004 Isuzu Amigo
1991-2020 Isuzu Panther
1996-2000 Isuzu Hombre
1996-2001 Isuzu Vertex
1996-1999 Isuzu Oasis
1997-2001 Isuzu VehiCROSS
2001-2004 Isuzu Axiom
2002-2008 Isuzu Ascender
2003-2009 Isuzu H-Series
2003-2011 Isuzu Journey-J
2004-2013 Isuzu MU-7
2005-2008 Isuzu i-Series

See also
Isuzu
List of Isuzu engines

References

Isuzu vehicles
Isuzu